Ikkan (一貫) (1817–1893) was one of the most renowned netsuke artists in Japan during the Edo period. He was from Nagoya, Owari province, central Japan. His pieces can be found in many museum collections and achieve high prices at auctions. 

He was part of a group of carvers in Nagoya, amongst who were Masayuki (正行), Masatoshi, Masatami and Masamitsu. The Nagoya school was established earlier in the 18th century under Tametaka.

See also 
 Tametaka
 Gechū 
 Masanao (Kyoto)

References

Bibliography 
 Frederick Meinertzhagen, The Meinertzhagen Card Index on Netsuke in the Archives of the British Museum, Alan R. Liss, Inc., New York, 1986, p.212. 
 Bandini, Rosemary (2019) The Larry Caplan Collection of Japanese Netsuke, p. 52, no. 27.

External links 

Culture in Nagoya
History of Nagoya
People from Nagoya
Netsuke-shi